WXKZ-FM (105.3 FM, "Oldies 105.3 The Kat") is a radio station licensed to serve Prestonsburg, Kentucky.  The station is owned by Gearheart Communications and licensed to Adam D. Gearheart.  It airs an oldies music format.

In addition to its music programming, WXKZ-FM carries a selection of local sporting events.

The station has been assigned these call letters by the Federal Communications Commission since February 2, 1987.

References

External links
Oldies 105.3 Facebook
Gearheart Communications official website

XKZ-FM
Oldies radio stations in the United States
Prestonsburg, Kentucky